This is a list of islands of Wales, the mainland of which is part of Great Britain, as well as a table of the largest Welsh islands by area. The list includes tidal islands such as Sully Island but not locations such as Shell Island which, though they are termed islands, are peninsulas.

Largest islands in Wales 

Holy Island and Anglesey are often counted together as they are separated by such a narrow channel.

Inland islands 
There are no islands of any great size in lakes in Wales. The crannog in Llangorse Lake is an artificial island. Several reservoirs contain islets e.g. Llyn Brenig, Elan Valley Reservoirs and Llyn Trawsfynydd, the last named having the largest and most numerous, though some are linked by causeways.

Places called "island" or "ynys" that are not islands
Some places around the Welsh coast are called island or (Welsh) ynys, but are not. Caution is required in that whilst 'ynys' most commonly translates as island, it has other meanings too. Some of these named places were formerly islands surrounded by marshland. Others are peninsulas or just coastal settlements. They include:

 Barry Island (tidal island until the construction of Barry Docks in the 1880s)
 Berges Island, peninsula at Whitford Burrows, Gower
 Dinas Island, peninsula on Pembrokeshire coast
 Farchynys, locality beside Mawddach estuary, Bontddu, Gwynedd
 Little Island, peninsula at the west end of the former Barry Island
 Shell Island
 Traeth Mawr - there are multiple examples of names including 'ynys' around Traeth Mawr, the now drained estuarine flats of the Afon Glaslyn, Gwynedd, including Hir Ynys, Ynys y Gwely, Ynys Ceiliog, Ynys Fawr, Ynys-fach and Ynys Fer-las.
 Ynys, hamlet on an area of raised ground known as Ynys Llanfihangel-y-traethau at Morfa Harlech, Gwynedd
 Ynys and nearby Ynys-fach on coast south of Dinas Dinlle, Gwynedd
 Ynyslas, locality at Borth, north Ceredigion - there are multiple examples of names including 'ynys' around the Dovey estuary including Ynys Tachwedd, Ynysfergi, Ynys Greigiog, Ynys-hir, Ynys Edwin, Ynys-Eidiol and simple 'Ynys'.
 Ynys Leurad, a small peninsula near Four Mile Bridge, Anglesey

See also 

 List of the British Isles

References

 Islands of Wales
Islands
Wales
Wales